Josep Maria Pons Irazazábal (born 12 April 1948 in Palma) is a Spanish diplomat. He was the president of RCD Mallorca from 8 July to 27 September 2010. From 28 June 2008 to 23 July 2010 was the Spanish ambassador in Austria, ceased as a precautionary measure after being wrongfully accused of sexual harassment. He has been the Spanish ambassador to Netherlands, Denmark and Lithuania. His brother Félix Pons, who died of cancer on 2 July 2010, was a Spanish politician who was the president of Congress of Deputies (Spain) from 1986 to 1996.

References

1948 births
Living people
People from Palma de Mallorca
Recipients of the Order of the Cross of Terra Mariana, 3rd Class
Ambassadors of Spain to Denmark
Ambassadors of Spain to the Netherlands
Ambassadors of Spain to Austria